Lojane is a village in the municipality of Lipkovo, North Macedonia. The settlement has a 99% ethnic Albanian and Muslim majority. The village is located on the border with Serbia.

Demographics
According to the 2021 census, the village had a total of 1,905 inhabitants. Ethnic groups in the village include:
Albanians: 1,858
Undeclared: 47

According to the 2002 census, the village had a total of 2,682 inhabitants. Ethnic groups in the village include:
Albanians: 2,668
Bosniaks: 3
Others: 11

Notable people 
Arif Hiqmeti

References

External links
 RFERL report

Villages in Lipkovo Municipality
Albanian communities in North Macedonia